Paul Carter (May 10, 1900 – death unknown) was an American Negro league pitcher in the 1930s. 

A native of Kennett Square, Pennsylvania, Carter made his Negro leagues debut in 1931 with the Hilldale Club. He went on to play for the Baltimore Black Sox and Philadelphia Stars, and finished his career in 1936 with the New York Black Yankees.

References

External links
 and Baseball-Reference Black Baseball stats and Seamheads

1900 births
Place of death missing
Year of death missing
Baltimore Black Sox players
Hilldale Club players
New York Black Yankees players
Philadelphia Stars players
Baseball pitchers
Baseball players from Pennsylvania
People from Kennett Square, Pennsylvania